Robert Dundas, 2nd Viscount Melville,  (14 March 1771 – 10 June 1851) was a British statesman, the son of Henry Dundas, the 1st Viscount. Dundas was the Member of Parliament for Hastings in 1794, Rye in 1796 and Midlothian in 1801. He was also Keeper of the Signet for Scotland from 1800. He was appointed a Privy Counsellor in 1807, a Fellow of the Royal Society in 1817, a Knight of the Thistle in 1821, and was Chancellor of the University of St Andrews from 1814. Melville filled various political offices and was First Lord of the Admiralty from 1812 to 1827, and from 1828 to 1830; his eldest son inherited his title.

Early life and family
He was born in Edinburgh on 14 March 1771, the only son of Henry Dundas, 1st Viscount Melville, and his first wife, the former Elizabeth Rannie (1751–1843). Educated at the Royal High School, Edinburgh, he went in 1786 with his tutor John Bruce on a continental tour and enrolled at Göttingen University. He studied afterwards at the University of Edinburgh and at Emmanuel College, Cambridge, and was admitted at Lincoln's Inn in 1788. After a successful attempt at law he became his father's private secretary from 1794, though he was brought in as MP for Hastings in 1794, and then Rye in 1796. The same year, on 29 August, he married an heiress, Anne Saunders (died 10 Sept 1841), and took her name beside his own. They had four sons and two daughters; their eldest son, Henry Dundas, later third Viscount Melville, became an army officer while their second son, Richard Saunders Dundas, became First Naval Lord.

President of the Board of Control
Dundas was appointed Keeper of the Signet for Scotland and elected MP for Midlothian (Edinburghshire) in 1801. He remained silent in parliament until his speeches of 1805 and 1806 in defence of his father, who was then being impeached. His first real test came in negotiating to be left in charge of Scotland by a hostile 'ministry of all the talents'. He got nowhere, but won the respect of his own side, and the problem vanished with the ministry's collapse. He was rewarded with the presidency of the Board of Control for India by the Duke of Portland in 1807.

Dundas's main task was to frustrate any possibility that Napoleon might exploit his alliance with Russia to make some attempt on British India. He sent a mission to the shah of Persia, at whose court French agents were present. He formed alliances with the princes of Lahore and Kabul. He ordered occupation of the Portuguese factories in India and China, of the Dutch colony of Java, and of the French stations on Mauritius and Réunion. He had also to deal with a sharp deterioration, through loss of trade during the war, in the finances of the East India Company. A series of reports on its development since the India Act of 1784, written by a select committee which he chaired, concluded that it should give up its inefficient trading privileges, at least in the subcontinent. Dundas drafted the legislation which ended them at the renewal of the company's charter in 1813.

Dundas's Indian administration was interrupted for six months in 1809 when he served as Chief Secretary for Ireland. Spencer Perceval, succeeding Portland, then wanted to promote him to the cabinet as secretary for war, but this did not happen due to the wishes of his father. Dundas returned to the Board of Control, still without a place in cabinet. He succeeded as Viscount Melville on 27 May 1811. The next year, under Prime Minister Lord Liverpool, he was promoted First Lord of the Admiralty.

Admiralty
While the Napoleonic wars went on, his job was to maintain the British maritime supremacy established at the battle of Trafalgar. In a state paper of February 1813 he pointed out that France, with the shipbuilding resources of the Netherlands and Italy at her disposal, would be able to construct a fleet to match Britain's if the struggle continued much longer. The point was underlined by complaints from the Duke of Wellington in Spain of inadequate protection for the convoys supplying him, especially after the outbreak of hostilities with the United States in 1812 unleashed hordes of American privateers on the Atlantic.

Drastic cuts followed the eventual peace, but Britain, now the only colonial power of any importance, found her maritime commitments increased. Melville did not think the fleet could be reduced much below 100 ships of the line. The cabinet set a limit of forty-four. The following years saw a constant struggle by Melville to find every possible economy while he avoided meeting a target he regarded as unreal. He quietly got his way, not least by improving the design and durability of ships, research on which benefited from his close personal interest. Yet he resisted the introduction of steamers, since an infant technology seemed bound to prove expensive and unreliable; moreover, if navies were to be rebuilt all round as steam driven, Britain would place herself on the same level as her rivals. By the late 1820s he was able to authorise the construction of new and larger classes of ship, matching those in France and the United States. Even out of tight budgets he never failed to squeeze something for another scientific interest, in exploration (where places are named after him, see below).

Scotland
Appointed a governor of the Bank of Scotland, he was elected chancellor of the University of St Andrews in 1814, and made a Knight of the Thistle in 1821. The crisis of the system came in 1827 on the resignation of Liverpool and the succession of George Canning, who was set on Catholic emancipation. Melville said that, while he personally supported it, he could not approve of a policy which would split the outgoing cabinet. The Whigs in Canning's coalition now persuaded him that a Scottish manager was unnecessary; the home secretary could do all the work with a native adviser or two.

First Lord of the Admiralty
The old governing interest in Scotland began to break up, a process which did not halt when Melville returned under Wellington and Sir Robert Peel as President of the Board of Control in 1828, then again at the Admiralty as First Lord of the Admiralty. The Reform Act would anyway end the arrangements under which the Dundases had ruled Scotland. Melville resigned in 1830, never to hold office again. But he made himself useful in good works, notably chairmanship of the royal commission which in 1845 proposed reform of the Scots poor law.

He died on 10 June 1851 at Melville Castle, and was buried in the family vault built for his father, in the Old Kirk, Lasswade, Edinburghshire, on 17 June.

His title passed to his eldest son Henry Dundas.

Arms

Place names
His name is perpetuated by that of Melville Sound and Melville Island, Canada because of his interest in Arctic exploration. Melville Island in the Northern Territory of Australia was also named for him, by explorer Phillip Parker King. Melville Bay in Greenland was named in his honour as well. He also gives his name to Melville Street in the New Town area of Edinburgh, Scotland, and a large statue of him by Sir John Steell stands in the central square of this street. The locality of Melville in Perth, Western Australia is also named after him.

References

External links 
 

1771 births
1851 deaths
Politicians from Edinburgh
People educated at the Royal High School, Edinburgh
University of Göttingen alumni
Alumni of the University of Edinburgh
Alumni of Emmanuel College, Cambridge
Viscounts in the Peerage of the United Kingdom
First Lords of the Admiralty
Chancellors of the University of St Andrews
Fellows of the Royal Society
Knights of the Thistle
Members of the Privy Council of the United Kingdom
Members of the Privy Council of Ireland
Dundas, Robert
British MPs 1790–1796
British MPs 1796–1800
Dundas, Robert
Dundas, Robert
Dundas, Robert
Dundas, Robert
Dundas, Robert
UK MPs who inherited peerages
Governors of the Bank of Scotland
People associated with Midlothian
Chief Secretaries for Ireland
Scottish Tory MPs (pre-1912)
Presidents of the Board of Control